A list of collegiate chapters of the Sigma Delta Tau fraternity for women.

Canada

United States

References

External links
 Sigma Delta Tau's Official International Website

Lists of chapters of United States student societies by society
chapters
Women-related lists